Michael Waldman is a British palaeontologist known for his work on fossil fish, mammals, and reptiles. He also discovered the globally important fossil site of Cladach a'Ghlinne, near Elgol on the Isle of Skye, Scotland. This site exposes the Kilmaluag Formation and provides a valuable record of Middle Jurassic ecosystems. During the 1970s he visited the site several times with fellow palaeontologist Robert Savage. The fossil turtle Eileanchelys waldmani was named after Michael in recognition of his notable contribution to palaeontology.

Academic career
Michael gained his PhD at Monash University in 1968. He worked as a research assistant at University of Bristol in the early 1970s working alongside Robert Savage. He went on to teach at Stowe School, Buckinghamshire, England, UK. Michael named the fossil fish Wadeichthys oxyops, the fossil mammaliaform Borealestes, and the tritylodontid, Stereognathus hebridicus (although S. hebridicus is now thought to be a junior synonym to S. ooliticus). Michael also contributed to understanding of the lepidosauromorph Marmoretta.

Publications
 Waldman, M., 1968. Fish from the freshwater Lower Cretaceous, near Koonwarra, Victoria, Australia: with comments on the palaeo-environment (Doctoral dissertation, Monash University).
 Waldman, M., 1970. Comments on a Cretaceous coprolite from Alberta, Canada. Canadian Journal of Earth Sciences, 7(3), pp.1008-1012.
 Waldman, M. 1971. Fish from the freshwater Lower Cretaceous of Victoria, Australia with comments on the palaeo-environment. Special Papers in Palaeontology 9: 1–62.
 Waldman, M. and Savage, R.J.G., 1972. The first Jurassic mammal from Scotland. Journal of the Geological Society, 128(2), 119-125.
 Waldman, M. 1974. Megalosaurds from the Bajocian (Middle Jurassic) of Dorset. Palaeontology, 17(2), 325–339.
 Waldman, M. and Evans, S.E., 1994. Lepidosauromorph reptiles from the Middle Jurassic of Skye. Zoological Journal of the Linnean Society, 112(1-2), 135-150. 
 Evans, S.E. and Waldman, M., 1996. Small reptiles and amphibians from the Middle Jurassic of Skye, Scotland. Museum of Northern Arizona Bulletin, 60, 219-226.

References

Living people
Year of birth missing (living people)
British palaeontologists
Monash University alumni